The Firebird Grid is a German single-place, paraglider that was designed and produced by Firebird Sky Sports AG of Füssen in the mid-2000s. It is now out of production.

Design and development
The Grid was designed as an intermediate glider. The models are each named for their relative size.

Variants
Grid S
Small-sized model for lighter pilots. The glider model is DHV 1-2 certified.
Grid M
Mid-sized model for medium-weight pilots. The glider model is DHV 1-2 certified.
Grid  L
Large-sized model for heavier pilots. The glider model is DHV 1-2 certified.

Specifications (Grid L)

References

Grid
Paragliders